Courtney John Haddock (May 24, 1906 – February 19, 1972) was a Canadian politician and had been the mayor of Victoria, British Columbia from 1969 to 1971.

References

Mayors of Victoria, British Columbia
1906 births
1972 deaths